Sylvester Matthew Terkay (born December 4, 1970) is a retired American professional wrestler, actor,and mixed martial artist best known for his run in WWE. He has held NWA Zero-One's United States Championship twice and Ultimate Pro Wrestling's first Heavyweight Champion.

Early life
While attending North Carolina State University, he finished second in the 1992 NCAA Division I Heavyweight tournament, losing to future Olympic gold medalist Kurt Angle by points, 3-2, and later became champion in 1993. According to Angle's autobiography It's True, It's True, Terkay had 78 pins during his college career.

Professional wrestling career
After training under Rick Bassman's Ultimate Pro Wrestling school in California, Terkay was signed to a WWE developmental contract, but later released. He joined Japanese pro wrestling promotion Pro Wrestling Zero1 in 2001 under the ring name The Predator, patterned after Bruiser Brody's character.

World Wrestling Entertainment (2006–2007)

After more training with WWE's Ohio Valley Wrestling (OVW) developmental territory, Terkay was brought up to the main roster of SmackDown! on July 28, 2006 working an MMA gimmick with Elijah Burke, who acted as his cornerman. Terkay defeated Matt Hardy in his debut match on SmackDown!. In the following weeks, Terkay dominated jobbers as well as later interfering in Burke's matches. On the October 20 episode of SmackDown!, Terkay helped Burke defeat Vito, breaking his 4-month undefeated streak. On the November 7, 2006 edition of WWE's ECW on Sci Fi, Terkay and his associate Elijah Burke debuted in ECW by doing a backstage promo. Their undefeated streak as a tag team was ended when The Hardys defeated them on ECW. At ECW's December To Dismember Terkay and Burke defeated The F.B.I. (Little Guido Maritato and Tony Mamaluke). In a backstage ECW promo Burke and Terkay dubbed themselves as the "Knock-out Tap-out Connection", a reference to Terkay's MMA and kickboxing background and Burke's amateur boxing background. He accompanied Burke to his matches in a bodyguard-type role for the next several weeks. Terkay remained undefeated in TV singles competition. On January 18, 2007, Terkay was released from his WWE contract.

Japan (2010–2012)
After leaving the WWE, Terkay returned to wrestling for the Japanese promotions of Inoki Genome Federation (IGF) and Pro Wrestling Zero1 and wrestled under his alter ego The Predator.

On March 31, 2012 Terkay worked his last match which took place in Georgetown, Guyana for the WrestleRama event.

Mixed martial arts career
During his time in Zero1, Terkay also fought in several mixed martial arts (MMA) matches for K-1. He made his debut by knocking his opponent Mauricio da Silva out in 13 seconds as part of the annual K-1 New Year's Eve spectacular, K-1 Dynamite. He returned at the Romanex event in 2004, facing Ultimate Fighting Championship and PRIDE Fighting Championships veteran Gary Goodridge. Despite Terkay's size advantage, experience played in Goodridge's favor and he finished Sylvester in 1:22.

Also in 2004, however, Terkay defeated K-1 veteran Kristof Midoux, former trainer of Georges St-Pierre and Choi Mu-Bae, submitting him with a wrestling neck crank. This attracted a revenge match against Mu-Bae, which was won again by Terkay by unanimous decision in his last MMA venture. It was reported he had trouble getting fight contracts, as his lack of name value mixed with his good performances were seen as dangerous to established stars.

Kickboxing career
In December 2005, Terkay made his kickboxing debut against Remy Bonjasky in K-1 Premium 2005, losing the match in a controversial unanimous decision. The normally polite Japanese audience booed heavily at this outcome, feeling Terkay was the true winner, and K-1 chairman Sadaharu Tanikawa agreed their opinion in the post-event press conference.

Terkay had his second and last kickboxing fight at K-1 Las Vegas, facing fellow superheavyweight Choi Hong-man, who came similarly from losing to Remy Bonjasky. Hong-man scored an early knockdown, but Terkay come back soon and fought a back and forth first round. The second was not different, with the Korean taking another point by knockdown and making Terkay bleed, only for Terkay to rally back and almost drop the Korean down before the bell rang. At the third, Terkay controlled an exhausted Choi, harassing him with combinations against the ropes until the end of the match. The decision was given to Choi due to the points scored. As in the previous match, the audience booed the decision, again feeling that Terkay was the victor and that the score system did not do justice to the match.

Other media
Terkay has appeared in multiple films and TV shows over the years. He appeared in the 2001 movie Slammed along with former wrestling personality Zeus. He appeared on an episode of In the House as a Santa Imposter, and also appeared on the game show Distraction and bodyslammed contestants while they tried to answer questions. He made an appearance in the 2006 movie Evil Bong as a nightclub bouncer. He appeared in the 2010 movie True Legend as a fighter named Elder Scot Brother.  He also appeared in the movie/documentary  "101 Reasons Not To Be A Pro Wrestler", where he talked about his views on the wrestling business. In the 2014 film Pro Wrestlers vs Zombies, Terkay makes a cameo appearance as a zombie wrestler who fights Kurt Angle.

Filmography
Film

Television

Mixed martial arts record

|-
| Win
|align=center| 3–1
| Mu Bae Choi
| Decision (unanimous)
| K-1 HERO's - HERO's 2005 in Seoul
| 
|align=center| 2
|align=center| 5:00
|Seoul, South Korea
|
|-
| Win
|align=center| 2–1
|  Kristof Midoux
| Submission (neck crank)
| K-1 - Premium 2004 Dynamite!!
| 
|align=center| 1
|align=center| 1:11
|Osaka, Japan
|
|-
| Loss
|align=center| 1–1
| Gary Goodridge
| TKO (punches)
| K-1 MMA - Romanex
| 
|align=center| 1
|align=center| 1:22
|Saitama, Japan
|
|-
| Win
|align=center| 1–0
| Mauricio da Silva
| TKO (punches)
| K-1 - Premium 2003 Dynamite!!
| 
|align=center| 1
|align=center| 0:13
|Nagoya, Japan
|

K-1 record

|-
| style="text-align:center;" colspan="8"|0 wins, 2 loss (2 decisions), 0 draws.
|-
!style="border-style: none none solid solid; background: #e3e3e3"| Result
!style="border-style: none none solid solid; background: #e3e3e3"| Opponent
!style="border-style: none none solid solid; background: #e3e3e3"| Method
!style="border-style: none none solid solid; background: #e3e3e3"| Event
!style="border-style: none none solid solid; background: #e3e3e3"| Date
!style="border-style: none none solid solid; background: #e3e3e3"| Round, Time
!style="border-style: none none solid solid; background: #e3e3e3"| Notes
|- align=center
| style="background:#fcc;"|Loss ||Choi Hong-man ||Decision (unanimous) ||K-1 World Grand Prix 2006 in Las Vegas||04/29/06 || 3, 3:00 ||
|- align=center
| style="background:#fcc;"|Loss ||Remy Bonjasky ||Decision (majority) ||K-1 Dynamite 2005 ||12/31/05|| 3, 3:00 ||

Championships and accomplishments

Amateur wrestling
National Collegiate Athletic Association
3 time All American-NC State Champion
1993 NCAA Champion-NC State
4 time National Heavyweight Champion
3 time AAU Wrestling Champion
1 time JUCO National Champion
4 time ACC Champion

Boxing
National Collegiate Athletic Association
5 time Boxing Champion
2 time NAC Boxing Champion

Professional wrestling
Pro Wrestling Illustrated
 Ranked No. 150 of the top 500 singles wrestlers in the PWI 500 in 2003
Pro Wrestling Zero1
Zero-One United States Heavyweight Championship (2 times) 
Ultimate Pro Wrestling
UPW Heavyweight Championship (1 time, inaugural)

References

External links

Profile at onlineworldofwrestling.com

 Sylvester Terkay at the National Wrestling Hall of Fame

1970 births
Living people
People from Washington, Pennsylvania
American male professional wrestlers
American male sport wrestlers
American male mixed martial artists
Mixed martial artists from Pennsylvania
Super heavyweight mixed martial artists
Mixed martial artists utilizing collegiate wrestling
Mixed martial artists utilizing boxing
American male kickboxers
Kickboxers from Pennsylvania
Heavyweight kickboxers
Professional wrestlers from Pennsylvania
NC State Wolfpack wrestlers
21st-century professional wrestlers